Lauren Suzanne Baillie-Whyte (born 1982) formerly Lauren Baillie is a Scottish international lawn bowler.

Biography
Baillie won a bronze medal in the pairs at the 2016 World Outdoor Bowls Championship in Christchurch with bowls partner Lesley Doig.

She also won the Scottish National Bowls Championships pairs title on four occasions with her sister Leanne Baillie in 2009, 2011, 2012 & 2013 bowling for Cockenzie & Port Seton. In 2019, she changed her name to Baillie-Whyte.

In 2020, she was selected for the 2020 World Outdoor Bowls Championship in Australia. 

In 2022, she competed in the women's triples and the Women's fours at the 2022 Commonwealth Games.

References

Scottish female bowls players
1982 births
Living people
Bowls players at the 2022 Commonwealth Games